"Club Can't Handle Me" is a song by American recording artist Flo Rida featuring French producer David Guetta. It was released as a digital download on iTunes on June 28, 2010 as the lead single of the Step Up 3D soundtrack album and is also included on Flo Rida's third studio album, Only One Flo (Part 1).

On October 11, 2010, The song topped the charts in Ireland, Poland, Portugal and the United Kingdom, and became a top five hit in Australia, Belgium Flanders, Canada, Finland, Germany, New Zealand and the Netherlands. In the United States, it peaked at number nine on the Billboard Hot 100. By December 2013, the song had sold 3 million copies in the US. The music video was filmed in Los Angeles and was directed by Marc Klasfeld.

Background and composition
"Club Can't Handle Me" was written by Flo Rida, Carmen Key, Kasia Livingston, Mike Caren, David Guetta, Frédéric Riesterer and Giorgio Tuinfort. Flo Rida sings lyrical vocals through the whole song. Songwriter Carmen Key sings background vocals during the chorus. Guetta was originally approached by Flo Rida's recording company, which asked whether Guetta would agree to produce songs for the rapper. The DJ, who often played Flo Rida's "Low" alongside "Love Is Gone" (his own collaboration with Chris Willis) when working in clubs, agreed. Flo Rida, who described the song as a "club anthem", said he always looked up to Guetta and that they both appreciated each others' earlier works. "Club Can't Handle Me" first premiered on Flo Rida's official website on June 9, 2010. On June 28, the song became available to download on iTunes. The song promotes the Step Up 3D film, and is the lead single of its soundtrack. The song is Flo Rida's 5th Top 10 hit.

Critical reception
Nick Levine of Digital Spy gave the song four stars out of five writing, "'Club Can't Handle Me' is a whopping great party banger – perhaps Guetta's straight up funnest  production since 'I Gotta Feeling'. Of course, Flo's lyrics are a parade of insane nonsense, as is the very concept behind the song." A reviewer from Billboard gave the song a positive review, calling the song "infectious", and stating, "Guetta provides an escalating beat – not unlike the one for The Black Eyed Peas' "I Gotta Feeling" – while Flo Rida delivers the sort of dependable party lyrics that put him on the map."

Live performances
On July 14, 2010, Flo Rida performed the song during The Tonight Show with Jay Leno. He performed the song on August 2 on The Wendy Williams Show, on August 3 on Jimmy Kimmel Live!, and on August 5 on So You Think You Can Dance.  The song was also featured in a dance routine to promote Step Up 3D on Late Night with Jimmy Fallon on August 13. On September 9, he had performed it live on ASAP XV On October 11, 2010, a Filipino variety show.

Music video
The music video for "Club Can't Handle Me" was directed by Marc Klasfeld and filmed in Los Angeles. It premiered E! channel's "Daily 10" segment on July 16 and July 15, 2010 on YouTube. On the same day, it was also uploaded on Flo Rida's official YouTube account. The video is taking place during an "opulent, extravagant club party", where Flo Rida raps in front of a crowd, while David Guetta is a DJ. It also features scenes taken from the Step Up 3D film. Flo Rida said of the video: "If you've ever dreamed about having the biggest party of your life, "Club Can't Handle Me" definitely represents that. Lotta energy. Lot of diamonds, ice sculptures. Just showing that boss vibe."

Track listing

Charts

Weekly charts

Year-end charts

Certifications

Release history

See also
List of number-one singles of 2010 (Ireland)
List of number-one singles of 2010 (Poland)
List of number-one singles of 2010 (Scotland)
List of number-one singles from the 2010s (UK)

References

2010 singles
Flo Rida songs
David Guetta songs
Songs written by David Guetta
Irish Singles Chart number-one singles
Number-one singles in Israel
Number-one singles in Poland
Number-one singles in Scotland
UK Singles Chart number-one singles
Songs written by Giorgio Tuinfort
Songs written by Frédéric Riesterer
Songs written by Mike Caren
Songs written by Flo Rida
2010 songs
Song recordings produced by David Guetta